Mad Libs is a phrasal template word game created by Leonard Stern and Roger Price. It consists of one player prompting others for a list of words to substitute for blanks in a story before reading aloud. The game is frequently played as a party game or as a pastime.

The game was invented in the United States, and more than 110 million copies of Mad Libs books have been sold since the series was first published in 1958.

History
Mad Libs was invented in 1953 by Leonard Stern and Roger Price. Stern and Price created the game, but could not agree on a name for their invention. No name was chosen until five years later (1958), when Stern and Price were eating Eggs Benedict at a restaurant in New York City.  
While eating, the two overheard an argument at a neighboring table between a talent agent and an actor. According to Price and Stern, during the overheard argument, the actor said that he wanted to "ad-lib" an upcoming interview. The agent, who clearly disagreed with the actor's suggestion, retorted that ad-libbing an interview would be "mad". Stern and Price used that eavesdropped conversation to create, at length, the name "Mad Libs". In 1958, the duo released the first book of Mad Libs, which resembled the earlier games of consequences and exquisite corpse.

Stern was head writer and comedy director for The Steve Allen Show, and suggested to the show's host that guests be introduced using Mad Libs completed by the audience. Four days after an episode introduced "our guest NOUN, Bob Hope", bookstores sold out of Mad Libs books.

Stern and Price next partnered with Larry Sloan, a high school friend who was working as a publicist at the time, to continue publishing Mad Libs.  Together, the three founded the publishing firm Price Stern Sloan in the early 1960s as a way to release Mad Libs.  In addition to releasing more than 70 editions of Mad Libs under Sloan, the company also published 150 softcover books, including such notable titles as How to Be a Jewish Mother, first released in 1964; Droodles, which was also created by Roger Price; The VIP Desk Diary; and the series World's Worst Jokes.

Price died in 1990, and three years later, Sloan and Stern sold Price Stern Sloan, including Mad Libs, to the former Putnam Berkley Group, which is now known as Penguin Random House. Mad Libs books are still published by Penguin Random House; however, all references to Price Stern Sloan have been removed from the company's official website. Stern died at age 88 on June 7, 2011, and Sloan on October 14, 2012.

More than 110 million copies of Mad Libs have been sold since the game series was first published in 1958.

Predecessors of Mad Libs 
It is unclear whether the creators of Mad Libs were aware of existing games and books similar to their own. One such game is Revelations about my Friends, published anonymously by Fredrick A. Stokes Companies in New York in 1912. Like Mad Libs, the book invites the reader to choose words of different categories which then become part of a story. The nineteenth century parlor game "Consequences" and the surrealists' Exquisite Corpse game are also similar to Mad Libs.

Format
Mad Libs books contain short stories on each page with many key words replaced with blanks. Beneath each blank is specified a category, such as "noun", "verb", "place", "celebrity", "exclamation" or "part of the body". One player asks the other players, in turn, to contribute a word of the specified type for each blank, but without revealing the context for that word. Finally, the completed story is read aloud. The result is usually a sentence which is comical, surreal and/or takes on somewhat of a nonsensical tone.

Stern and Price's original Mad Libs book gives the following sentence as an example:

  "___! he said  as he jumped into his convertible __ and drove off with his _ wife."
 exclamation           adverb                                     noun                         adjective 

After completion, they demonstrate that the sentence might read:

  "Ouch! he said stupidly as he jumped into his convertible car and drove off with his brave wife."

Books

The following is a list of most Mad Libs books in alphabetical order:

70s Mad Libs
80s Mad Libs
90s Mad Libs
A Very Mad Libs Christmas
Ad Lib Mad Libs
Aggretsuko Mad Libs
All I Want for Christmas Is Mad Libs
American Dad! Mad Libs
Baby Shower Mad Libs
Barbie Mad Libs
Bee Movie Mad Libs
Best of Mad Libs
Birthday Party Mad Libs
Bob's Burgers Mad Libs
Bob's Burgers Grand Re-Opening Mad Libs
Camp Daze Mad Libs
Charlie and the Chocolate Factory Mad Libs
Christmas Cards Mad Libs
Christmas Carol Mad Libs
Christmas Cheer Mad Libs
Christmas Fun Mad Libs
Club Penguin Mad Libs
Clue Mad Libs
Cool Mad Libs
County Fair Mad Libs
Crazy Crafting Mad Libs
Dance Mania Mad Libs
Day of the Dead Mad Libs
DC Comics Super Hero Mad Libs
Dear Valentine Letters Mad Libs
Diary of a Wimpy Kid Mad Libs
Diary of a Wimpy Kid Mad Libs: Second Helping
Dinosaur Mad Libs
Dinosaur Mad Libs Junior
Disney Princess Mad Libs
Diva Girl Mad Libs
Doctor Who Mad Libs
Dog Ate My Mad Libs
Don't Get Mad Libs, Get Even Funnier
Dude, Where's My Mad Libs
Dungeons & Dragons Mad Libs
Dysfunctional Family Therapy Mad Libs
Easter Basket Mad Libs
Easter Eggstravaganza Mad Libs
Eid al-Fitr Mad Libs
Election Day Mad Libs
Escape from Detention Mad Libs
Family Guy Mad Libs
Family Tree Mad Libs
Fear Factor Mad Libs
Fear Factor Mad Libs: Ultimate Grossout!
Field Trip Mad Libs
Finding Dory Mad Libs
First Day of School Mad Libs
Foo Fighters Mad Libs
Frozen Mad Libs
Game Over! Mad Libs
Gender Reveal Party Mad Libs
Give Me Liberty or Give Me Mad Libs
Go for the Gold! Mad Libs
Gobble Gobble Mad Libs
Godzilla Mad Libs
Goofy Mad Libs
Grab Bag Mad Libs
Graduation Mad Libs
Grand Slam Mad Libs
Gravity Falls Mad Libs
Halloween Party Mad Libs
Hanukkah Mad Libs
Happily Ever Mad Libs
Happy Birthday Mad Libs
Happy Diwali Mad Libs
Happy Housewarming Mad Libs
Happy Howl-o-ween Mad Libs
Happy Kwanzaa Mad Libs
Happy New Year Mad Libs
History of the World Mad Libs
Ho, Ho, Ho! Merry Mad Libs!
Hold Your Horses Mad Libs
Holly, Jolly Mad Libs
Home from School Mad Libs
Hot Off the Presses Mad Libs
Hot Wheels Mad Libs
How to Train Your Dragon Mad Libs
I Love Seattle Mad Libs
Impractical Jokers Mad Libs
Indiana Jones Mad Libs
JoJo Siwa Mad Libs
Keep It Curious, George Mad Libs
Kid Libs Mad Libs
Kung Fu Panda Mad Libs
L.O.L. Surprise! Mad Libs
LEGO Mad Libs
LEGO Star Wars Mad Libs
Letters from Camp Mad Libs
Like Father, Like Mad Libs
Love the Earth Mad Libs
Luck of the Mad Libs
Lunar New Year Mad Libs
Mad About Animals Mad Libs
Mad About Mad Libs
Mad Libs 40th Anniversary Edition
Mad Libs 50th Anniversary Edition
Mad Libs for President
Mad Libs Forever
Mad Libs From Outer Space
Mad Libs in Love
Mad Libs Mania
Mad Libs on the Road
Mad Mad Mad Mad Mad Libs
Mad Scientist Mad Libs
Mad, Madder, Maddest Mad Libs
Marvel's Avengers Mad Libs
Marvel's Guardians of the Galaxy Mad Libs
Marvel's Spider-Man Mad Libs
Masters of the Universe Mad Libs
Meow Libs
Merry Christmas! Love, Mad Libs
Merry Merry Mad Libs
Mickey Mouse Mad Libs
Minions Mad Libs
Mitzvah Mad Libs
Monopoly Mad Libs
Monster Mad Libs
Monster Mash Mad Libs
More Best of Mad Libs
Mother Knows Mad Libs
Much Ado About Mad Libs
Nickelodeon: Nick 90s Mad Libs
Night of the Living Mad Libs
Ninjas Mad Libs
Off-the-Wall Mad Libs
Olaf's Frozen Adventure Mad Libs
Operation Mad Libs
Over The Hedge Mad Libs
Parks and Recreation Mad Libs
Peace, Love, and Mad Libs
Penguin Classics Mad Libs
Pets-a-Palooza Mad Libs
Pirates Mad Libs
Pokémon Mad Libs
Presidential Mad Libs
Presidential Mad Libs
Pride Parade Mad Libs
Prime-Time Mad Libs
Rick and Morty Mad Libs
Roald Dahl: The Witches Mad Libs
Rock 'n' Roll Mad Libs
Scooby-Doo Mad Libs
Shark Attack! Mad Libs
Slam Dunk Mad Libs
Sleepover Party Mad Libs
Sonic the Hedgehog Mad Libs
Son of Mad Libs
Sooper Dooper Mad Libs
SpongeBob SquarePants Mad Libs
Spy Mad Libs
Star Trek Mad Libs
Star Wars Mad Libs
Star Wars Droids Mad Libs
Star Wars: The Clone Wars Mad Libs
Steven Universe Mad Libs
Stocking Stuffer Mad Libs
Straight "A" Mad Libs
Supersize Mad Libs
Teachers Rule! Mad Libs
The Amazing World of Gumball Mad Libs
The Big Bang Theory Mad Libs
The Incredibles Mad Libs
The Muppets Mad Libs
The Office Mad Libs
The Original #1 Mad Libs
The Penguins of Madagascar Mad Libs
The Powerpuff Girls Mad Libs
The Wizard of Oz Mad Libs
The World of Roald Dahl Mad Libs
Totally Pink Mad Libs
Toy Story Mad Libs
Transformers BotBots Mad Libs
Travel Far and Mad Libs
Trick or Treat Mad Libs
Trolls Mad Libs
Undead Mad Libs
Unicorns, Mermaids, and Mad Libs
Unidentified Flying Mad Libs
Upside Down Mad Libs
Vacation Fun Mad Libs
Valentine's Day Mad Libs
Who Was? Mad Libs
Winter Games Mad Libs
Wonder Woman Mad Libs
WWE Mad Libs
You've Got Mad Libs

Other media
A game show called Mad Libs, with some connections to the game, aired on the Disney Channel in 1998 and 1999.

Several imitations of Mad Libs have been created, most of them on the Internet. Imitation Mad Libs are sometimes used in educational settings to help teach kids the parts of speech.

Looney Labs released Mad Libs: The Game, a card game, in 2016. There is also a Mad Libs mobile app.

See also
Snowclone
Phrasal template
Cloze test
Consequences (game)
Exquisite corpse
Cards Against Humanity

References

External links
 madlibs.com

Word games
Book series introduced in 1958
Random text generation
Comedy books